Danielone is a phytoalexin found in the papaya fruit. This compound showed high antifungal activity against Colletotrichum gloesporioides, a pathogenic fungus of papaya.  A laboratory synthesis of danielone has been reported.

References 

Aromatic ketones
Phytoalexins
Resorcinol ethers
Phenols
Alpha-hydroxy ketones